Stuart Griffiths (born 31 January 1969) is a former Australian rules footballer who played with Richmond in the Victorian/Australian Football League (VFL/AFL).

Griffiths, who played originally for Old Melburnians in the Victorian Football Association, was picked up by Richmond in the 1989 Pre-season Draft. He made eight appearances in the 1989 VFL season, which included a strong debut performance, against Footscray at the MCG, where he had 20 disposals and kicked three goals. A rover, Griffiths didn't play a senior game in 1990 and played only the opening two rounds of the 1991 season. He made seven appearances in 1992, but was delisted at the end of the year.

References

1969 births
Australian rules footballers from Victoria (Australia)
Richmond Football Club players
Old Melburnians Football Club players
Living people